POMS or Poms may refer to:

 Production and Operations Management is an academic society and a peer-reviewed academic journal covering research on all topics in product and process design, operations, and supply chain management.
 Pom-pons, a hand-held decoration used in cheerleading or a related sport also called "poms" or "pom-pons"
 Poms (slang), slang term for British people
 Profile of mood states, a psychological rating scale used to assess transient, distinct mood states
 Poms (film), a 2019 American comedy film

See also
 Pom (disambiguation)
 Pommes frites, or french fries
 Ten Pound Poms, a colloquial term used in Australia and New Zealand to describe British migrants